František Kunzo (born 17 September 1954 in Spišský Hrušov) is a Slovak former football player who competed in the 1980 Summer Olympics.

References

1954 births
Living people
Slovak footballers
Czechoslovak footballers
Olympic footballers of Czechoslovakia
Footballers at the 1980 Summer Olympics
Olympic gold medalists for Czechoslovakia
Olympic medalists in football
Medalists at the 1980 Summer Olympics
Association football defenders
FK Dukla Banská Bystrica players
FC Lokomotíva Košice players
People from Spišská Nová Ves District
Sportspeople from the Košice Region